The Donald Grant Herring Estate, called Rothers Barrows, was designed by Wilson Eyre, Jr. in 1919 for Donald Herring, a member of the Princeton University faculty.  The three properties at 52, 72, and 75-77 Arreton Road are the surviving remnants of the 117-acre estate, which was subdivided in 1949.  The estate's significance is as the last, chronologically, of the estates that once ringed Princeton.  It is one of the finest examples of the Arts and Crafts movement in Central New Jersey.

In 2016, the estate was put up for sale, listed at $3.8 million.

Gallery

See also
National Register of Historic Places listings in Mercer County, New Jersey

References

Houses in Princeton, New Jersey
Houses on the National Register of Historic Places in New Jersey
National Register of Historic Places in Mercer County, New Jersey
New Jersey Register of Historic Places